Oedancala crassimana is a species of true bug in the family Pachygronthidae. It is found in the Caribbean, North America, and South America.

References

Lygaeoidea
Articles created by Qbugbot
Insects described in 1803